Blonde Alibi is a 1946 American black-and-white noir thriller directed by Will Jason and starring Tom Neal, Martha O'Driscoll, Donald MacBride, and Peter Whitney.

Cast
Tom Neal as Rick Lavery
Martha O'Driscoll as Marian Gale
Donald MacBride as Insp. Carmichael
Peter Whitney as Police Lt. Melody Haynes
Samuel S. Hinds as Prof. Slater
Robert Armstrong as Williams
Elisha Cook Jr. as Sam Collins
Marc Lawrence as Joe DeRita
Oliver Blake as Pat Tenny
John Berkes as Louie Comey

Home media
In 2004 the film was released on DVD by Teakwood Video.

References

External links
 
 
 

1946 films
Universal Pictures films
Films directed by Will Jason
1940s thriller films
American black-and-white films
American thriller films
1940s English-language films
1940s American films